Jon Emili Uriarte (born October 15, 1961) is an Argentine former volleyball player and current coach, who represented his native country at the 1988 Summer Olympics in Seoul, winning the bronze medal with the men's national team. He also obtained the bronze medal at the 1982 World Championship held in Argentina.

Uriarte, born in Buenos Aires, played 8 seasons in Europe, at the Italian A1 first division, in France, and in the Netherlands. He obtained 3 Argentine leagues, and played 11 years for the Argentine national team, including four World Championships and two Olympic Games.

As a head coach, he worked in Azul VC from 1991 to 2001, playing six Argentine League finals and winning the championship four of them: 1991/92, 92/93, 93/94 and 2000/01.

In 2001 he became Australia's head coach, qualifying the team in 2004 for the first time to the Olympics for their own right. Uriarte also established the first full-time Junior Development Program at the Australian Institute of Sport ( www.ais.gov.au ).

In 2005 Uriarte moved to Brazil to coach Telemig/Minas Tenis Clube, obtaining the Paulistan League Champion 2005, and leading the teach to the second position of the Brazilian Super league regular season in 2006.
In April 2006 he was appointed as a new Argentine head coach.
After he has developed a new generation a players in Argentina he took the position as a head coach of Vibo Valentia, Italy in A1 division.

In May 2011, Uriarte was again hired by the Australian Volleyball Federation, reprising his role as head coach of the Australian men's volleyball team.
In June 2012 at the AOGQ tournament played in Japan he led the Australian team to qualify to the Olympic Games for the second time.

After working in different parts of the world, besides Spanish Jon Uriarte can speak English, Italian, French and Portuguese.

References
 FIVB Profile
 OzVolley.org Announcement

1961 births
Living people
Volleyball players from Buenos Aires
Argentine men's volleyball players
Argentine volleyball coaches
Olympic volleyball players of Argentina
Volleyball players at the 1984 Summer Olympics
Volleyball players at the 1988 Summer Olympics
Olympic bronze medalists for Argentina
Olympic medalists in volleyball
Australian Institute of Sport coaches
Medalists at the 1988 Summer Olympics